Lower Twin Island is a bar island on the Ohio River in the city of Wheeling, West Virginia. Lower Twin Island and its twin, Upper Twin Island, lie northwest of Wheeling's Warwood neighborhood.

See also 
List of islands of West Virginia

River islands of West Virginia
Landforms of Ohio County, West Virginia
Islands of the Ohio River